The 2016–17 season is the 108th season in Reus Deportiu ’s history.

Squad

Competitions

Liga

League table

Copa del Rey

References

CF Reus Deportiu seasons
Reus Deportiu